Stephanie Geltmacher (born August 21, 1990) is an American mixed martial artist and  currently she competes in the flyweight division. She has previously competed for Invicta Fighting Championships.

Background
Aggressive as a child, Geltmacher's father suggested her to start some sort of martial art. She started training Brazilian jiu-jitsu at the age of ten and started wrestling in high school. She attended Yakima Valley College for a year and transferred to Oklahoma City University, being an All-American in wrestling in all four years. Not sure what to do after the college, she started training mixed martial arts with her boyfriend who already trained the sport.

Mixed martial arts career

Early career 
After going 3–1 as an amateur, Geltmacher amassed a record of 2–0 prior signed by Invicta Fighting Championships.

Invicta Fighting Championships 
Geltmacher made her Invicta debut on July 21, 2018, against Kerri Kenneson, replacing Alexa Conners, at Invicta FC 30. She won the fight by technical knockout.

Her next fight came on November 16, 2018, facing Liz Tracy at  Invicta FC 32. She won the fight via unanimous decision.

On August 9, 2019, Geltmacher faced Victoria Leonardo at Invicta FC 36. She lost the fight via unanimous decision.

After her first career loss, Geltmacher was scheduled to fight Erin Blanchfield at Invicta FC 41: Morandin vs. Ruiz on July 30, 2020. However, she withdrew from the bout and was replaced by Brogan Walker-Sanchez.

Geltmacher was then expected to face Trisha Cicero at Invicta FC 43 on November 20, 2020. However, Cicero was forced to withdraw and was replaced by Caitlin Sammons. Geltmacher won the fight via first-round knockout.

Mixed martial arts record 

|-
|Win
|align=center|5–1
|Caitlin Sammons
|KO (punches)
|Invicta FC 43
|
|align=center|1
|align=center|4:28
|Kansas City, Kansas, United States
|
|-
|Loss
|align=center|4–1
|Victoria Leonardo
|Decision (unanimous)
|Invicta FC 36
|
|align=center|3
|align=center|5:00
|Kansas City, Kansas, United States
|
|-
|Win
|align=center|4–0
|Liz Tracy
|Decision (unanimous)
|Invicta FC 32
|
|align=center|3
|align=center|5:00
|Shawnee, Oklahoma, United States
|
|-
|Win
|align=center|3–0
|Kerri Kenneson
|TKO (elbows)
|Invicta FC 30
|
|align=center|1
|align=center|3:32
|Kansas City, Missouri, United States
|
|-
|Win
|align=center|2–0
|Ky Bennett
|Decision (unanimous)
|Bellator 189
|
|align=center|3
|align=center|5:00
|Thackerville, Oklahoma, United States
|
|-
|Win
|align=center| 1–0
|Dayona Haden
|Decision (unanimous)
|HD Boxing: Rampage at Remington
|
|align=center| 3
|align=center| 5:00
|Oklahoma City, Oklahoma, United States
|
|-

References

External links 
 
 Stephanie Geltmacher at Invicta FC

Living people
1990 births
American female mixed martial artists
Flyweight mixed martial artists
Mixed martial artists utilizing collegiate wrestling
Mixed martial artists utilizing Brazilian jiu-jitsu
American female sport wrestlers
Amateur wrestlers
American practitioners of Brazilian jiu-jitsu
Female Brazilian jiu-jitsu practitioners
Sportspeople from New York (state)
Mixed martial artists from Hawaii
21st-century American women